Sreya Raghav is an Indian playback singer. She was born in Abu Dhabi and is the daughter of yesteryear singer/actress Palayad Yashoda.

Sreya's song Nilamanaltharikalil appeared in the soundtrack for the Malayalam movie Kismath.

Career 
Raghav was introduced to the Malayalam film industry by Gopi Sundar. 

She has sung the background tracks for films such as Left Right Left and 5 Sundarikal.

Filmography

References

External links 

 

Living people
Indian women playback singers
Malayalam playback singers
Year of birth missing (living people)